The Chinese loanwords are usually concerned with cuisine, trade or often just exclusively things Chinese. According to the 2000 census, the relative number of people of Chinese descent in Indonesia (termed the peranakan) is almost 1% (totaling to about 3 million people, although this may likely be an underestimate due to an anti-Chinese sentiment that exists in some circles of the population), yet the peranakan are the most successful when it comes to business, trade, and cuisine. Words of Chinese origin (presented here with accompanying Hokkien/ Mandarin pronunciation derivatives as well as traditional and simplified characters) include pisau (匕首 bǐshǒu  – knife), mie (T:麵, S:面, Hokkien mī – noodles), lumpia (潤餅 (Hokkien = lūn-piáⁿ) – springroll), teko (T:茶壺, S:茶壶 = cháhú [Mandarin], teh-ko [Hokkien] = teapot), 苦力 kuli = 苦　khu (bitter) and 力　li (energy) and even the widely used slang terms gua and lu (from the Hokkien 'goa' 我 and 'lu/li' 你 – meaning 'I/ me' and 'you'). Almost all loanwords in Indonesian of Chinese origin come from Hokkien (福建) or Hakka (客家).

Spelling

Loanwords

A

B

C

D

E

F

G

H

I

J

K

L

M

N

O

P

S

T

U

V

W

Y

Bibliography 

 Badudu, J.S; Kamus Kata-kata Serapan Asing Dalam Bahasa Indonesia; Kompas, Jakarta, 2003
 Kamus Besar Bahasa Indonesia, Departemen Pendidikan dan Kebudayaan, Jakarta, Balai Pustaka: 1999, halaman 1185 s.d. 1188 berisikan Pendahuluan buku Senarai Kata Serapan dalam Bahasa Indonesia, Departemen Pendidikan dan Kebudayaan, Jakarta, 1996 (dengan sedikit penyaduran tanpa mengubah maksud dan tujuan seseungguhnya dari buku ini).

References

Indonesia culture-related lists
Indonesian language
Indonesian words and phrases